Ron (Ronny) Koperli (born November 16, 1983) is an Israeli football manager.

References

External links
 

1983 births
Living people
Israeli Jews
Israeli footballers
Maccabi Sha'arayim F.C. players
Maccabi Netanya F.C. players
Maccabi Ahi Nazareth F.C. players
Hapoel Jerusalem F.C. players
Hapoel Ashkelon F.C. players
Ahva Arraba F.C. players
Maccabi Yavne F.C. players
Maccabi Ironi Bat Yam F.C. players
Beitar Kfar Saba F.C. players
Sektzia Ness Ziona F.C. players
Association football defenders
Israeli football managers
Maccabi Sha'arayim F.C. managers